Claudiu Eugen Ionescu (born August 24, 1959 in Constanţa) is a former Romanian handball player who competed in the 1980 Summer Olympics.

Ionescu was a member of the Romanian handball team, which won the bronze medal. He played five matches as goalkeeper.

External links
 
 

1959 births
Living people
Romanian male handball players
HC Dobrogea Sud Constanța players
Olympic handball players of Romania
Olympic bronze medalists for Romania
Olympic medalists in handball
Handball players at the 1980 Summer Olympics
Medalists at the 1980 Summer Olympics